All Systems Go is the second and final studio album by American glam metal band Vinnie Vincent Invasion, released on May 17, 1988. All Systems Go featured new vocalist Mark Slaughter, who replaced Robert Fleischman. The band toured in support for the album, headlining small clubs, but broke up after the completion of the tour at the end of August 1988. The album features Yngwie Malmsteen's vocalist Jeff Scott Soto on backing vocals.

Album information
The singles "That Time of Year" and "Love Kills" are 2 of 4 Vinnie Vincent Invasion songs featured on the 2008 tribute album KISS MY ANKH: A Tribute To Vinnie Vincent. "That Time of Year" features Sheldon Tarsha of Adler's Appetite, Ryan Roxie from the Alice Cooper band, Marko Pukkila of Altaria and Troy Patrick Farrell of White Lion. "Love Kills" was recorded by Vic Rivera and Kelli McCloud.

On the 2003 remastered CD-version as released by Chrysalis Records manufactured by EMI/Capitol Records, the running time for "Love Kills" is 4:36. Various parts of Vinnie's solo as well as even some verses have been shortened by either cutting out a couple bars of music or lines of lyrics.

Reception

All Systems Go peaked at No. 64 on the Billboard 200 Two singles from the album, "Love Kills" and "That Time of Year" were released with music videos. "Love Kills" was featured in the soundtrack for A Nightmare on Elm Street 4: The Dream Master. MTV hosted an entire hour for the film A Nightmare on Elm Street 4: The Dream Master which featured Robert Englund as Freddy Krueger and guest Vinnie Vincent promoting the music video. However, it seems that while the song is still in the film, later releases of the Dream Master on VHS and DVD have the song turned down quite a bit compared to other songs in the film and songs in other films from the Nightmare on Elm Street series. A third track from the album, "Ashes to Ashes" received some radio airplay.

Track listing

Personnel 
Mark Slaughter - lead vocals
Vinnie Vincent - lead guitar, backing vocals
Dana Strum - bass guitar, backing vocals
Bobby Rock - drums

Additional personnel
Jeff Scott Soto - backing vocals

References

1988 albums
Capitol Records albums
Chrysalis Records albums
Vinnie Vincent Invasion albums